Patrizio Gennari (24 November 1820, in Moresco – 1 February 1897, in Cagliari) was an Italian botanist and patriot. He served in the Second Italian War of Independence (the Austro-Sardinian War). From 1866 to 1892, he was a professor at the University of Cagliari, Sardinia, and director of the university's botanic garden, the Orto Botanico dell'Università di Cagliari. The orchid genus Gennaria is named after him.

References

19th-century Italian botanists
1820 births
1897 deaths